Jerry D. Williams (February 15, 1941) is a Democratic member of the Kansas House of Representatives, representing the 8th district.  He served from 2001 to 2013.

Prior to being elected, Williams served as a Chanute City Commissioner from 1986-1992 and a Neosho County Commissioner from 1992-1997.  He has undergraduate and graduate degrees in education, along with a Master of Science in Gerontology.  Williams has worked in a number of fields, including farming and ranching, teaching, and hospital administration.

Married to wife Kathy for over 40 years, they have five children and eight grandchildren.

Committee membership
 Agriculture and Natural Resources Budget (Ranking Member)
 Transportation

Major donors
The top 5 donors to Williams' 2008 campaign were all individuals:
1. Latham, Lance	$500 	
2. Beachner, Eugene C	$500 	
3. Slaughter, Jerry 	$500 	
4. Beachner, Eugene K 	$500 	
5. Robbins, Gary L 	$500

References

External links
 Kansas Legislature - Jerry Williams
 Project Vote Smart profile
 Kansas Votes profile
 State Surge - Legislative and voting track record
 Follow the Money campaign contributions:
 2000,2002, 2004, 2006, 2008

County commissioners in Kansas
Democratic Party members of the Kansas House of Representatives
Living people
1941 births
21st-century American politicians